Brendan's Magical Mystery Tour is a reality game show broadcast since 24 June 2013 on Channel 4. The show is a spin-off from the popular Coach Trip, which also stars tour guide Brendan Sheerin.

The show sends four sets of eight strangers from the United Kingdom off to different countries around Europe and North America where they must compete in daily challenges in order to be upgraded to luxury or downgraded to no-star, super-cheap accommodation.

Contestants

Week 1 - Barcelona
Episodes one to five saw eight strangers from different parts of the UK travel to Barcelona where they will compete in daily challenges for the chance of being upgraded. On the last day, the worst four of the contestants are eliminated and the remaining four are split into two teams to go head-to-head. When a team has won the winners challenge, the eliminated contestants vote in secret for whom they want to win the £1,000 cash prize. This week aired between 24 June to 28 June 2013.

Barcelona results
 Neither won or lost in the challenge, so returned to the standard hotel.
 Upgraded to luxury accommodation.
 Downgraded to minimal accommodation.

Day 1

Day 2

Day 3

Day 4

Day 5

Week 2 - Jamaica
Episodes six to ten saw eight strangers from different parts of the UK travel to Jamaica where they will compete in daily challenges for the chance of being upgraded. On the last day, the worst four of the contestants are eliminated and the remaining four are split into two teams to go head-to-head. When a team has won the winners challenge, the eliminated contestants vote in secret for whom they want to win the £1,000 cash prize. This week aired between 1 July to 5 July 2013.

Jamaica results
 Neither won or lost in the challenge, so returned to the standard hotel.
 Upgraded to luxury accommodation.
 Downgraded to minimal accommodation.

Day 1

Day 2

Day 3

Day 4

Day 5

Week 3 - Cancún
Episodes eleven to fifteen saw eight strangers from different parts of the UK travel to Cancún where they will compete in daily challenges for the chance of being upgraded. On the last day, the worst four of the contestants are eliminated and the remaining four are split into two teams to go head-to-head. When a team has won the winners challenge, the eliminated contestants vote in secret for whom they want to win the £1,000 cash prize. This week aired between 8 July to 12 July 2013.

Cancún results
 Neither won or lost in the challenge, so returned to the standard hotel.
 Upgraded to luxury accommodation.
 Downgraded to minimal accommodation.

Day 1

Day 2

Day 3

Day 4

Day 5

Week 4 - Istanbul
Episodes sixteen to twenty saw eight strangers from different parts of the UK travel to Istanbul where they will compete in daily challenges for the chance of being upgraded. On the last day, the worst four of the contestants are eliminated and the remaining four are split into two teams to go head-to-head. When a team has won the winners challenge, the eliminated contestants vote in secret for whom they want to win the £1,000 cash prize. This week aired between 15 July to 19 July 2013.

Istanbul results
 Neither won or lost in the challenge, so returned to the standard hotel.
 Upgraded to luxury accommodation.
 Downgraded to minimal accommodation.

Day 1

Day 2

Day 3

Day 4

Day 5

References 

2013 British television series debuts
2013 British television series endings
2010s British reality television series
Mass media in Barcelona
Cancún
Channel 4 reality television shows
English-language television shows
Mass media in Istanbul
Television series by ITV Studios
Television shows set in Jamaica
Television shows set in Mexico
Television shows set in Spain
Television shows set in Turkey